Barfi is a dense milk based sweet confectionery from South Asia.
It may also refer to:

Barfi!, 2012 Indian film in Hindi
Barfi (film), 2013 Indian film in Kannada